Chong Siao Chin (張小遷, Pinyin: Zhāng Xiǎo-qiān, Jyutping: Zoeng1 Siu2 Cin1; born 12 May 1957) is a Hong Kong judoka. He competed at the 1984 Summer Olympics and the 1988 Summer Olympics.

References

External links
 

1957 births
Living people
Hong Kong male judoka
Olympic judoka of Hong Kong
Judoka at the 1984 Summer Olympics
Judoka at the 1988 Summer Olympics
Place of birth missing (living people)
Asian Games medalists in judo
Judoka at the 1986 Asian Games
Asian Games bronze medalists for Hong Kong
Medalists at the 1986 Asian Games
20th-century Hong Kong people
21st-century Hong Kong people